Rudolf Houtsch (8 January 1916 – 20 December 2003) was a Luxembourgian cyclist. He competed in the individual and team road race events at the 1936 Summer Olympics.

References

External links
 

1916 births
2003 deaths
Luxembourgian male cyclists
Olympic cyclists of Luxembourg
Cyclists at the 1936 Summer Olympics
Place of birth missing